It's Five O'Clock is the second studio album by Greek progressive rock band Aphrodite's Child.

Track listing
All songs written by Richard Francis and Vangelis Papathanassiou, except where noted.

Personnel
Aphrodite's Child
 Vangelis – keyboards, organ, piano, clavichord, flutes, production
 Demis Roussos – lead vocals, bass, guitar, production
 Lucas Sideras – drums, percussion, production, lead vocals on "Let Me Love, Let Me Live" and "Funky Mary"

Technical
 Malcolm Toft – engineer
 Hitoshi Takiguchi – mastering

Releases
The album was re-released in the UK on Esoteric Recordings in 2010.

References

External links
 

Aphrodite's Child albums
1969 albums
Polydor Records albums
Albums recorded at Trident Studios